The Delray Beach Seaboard Air Line Railway Station (also known as the Delray Beach Railroad Station) is a historic Seaboard Air Line Railway depot in Delray Beach, Florida, United States. The station is located at 1525 West Atlantic Avenue.

Constructed in 1927 and designed by Gustav Maass of the West Palm Beach architectural firm of Harvey & Clarke, it is identical to the Homestead Seaboard station further south, with the sole exception of its use of plain stucco rather than corinthian arches. In addition, the northern end of the station containing what was the freight room has been modified and enlarged since its original construction.  The station was also identical to the Boynton Beach Seaboard depot just to the north, the destruction of which was authorized by the city of Boynton Beach in 2006 despite its historic nature.

Amtrak continued passenger service to the station after taking over the Seaboard Silver Meteor and Silver Star routes in 1971. Tri-Rail began commuter rail service to the station in 1989, but in 1991 moved to a new Delray Beach station a few blocks south because of legal squabbles with the then-owner of the Seaboard station and poor access. Passenger service to the station halted completely in 1995 when Amtrak began using the Tri-Rail station as its Delray Beach stop.

The station was added to the U.S. National Register of Historic Places on September 4, 1986.

On February 25, 2020, the station was largely destroyed by arson, and it is not known if the city of Delray Beach will continue with the restoration at this time.

Gallery

References

External links

Florida's Office of Cultural and Historical Programs
Palm Beach County listings
Delray Beach Historical Society

Railway stations on the National Register of Historic Places in Florida
Delray Beach, Florida
Railway stations in the United States opened in 1927
Railway stations closed in 1995
National Register of Historic Places in Palm Beach County, Florida
D
Former Amtrak stations in Florida
Historic American Buildings Survey in Florida
Transportation buildings and structures in Palm Beach County, Florida
1927 establishments in Florida
Former railway stations in Florida